Flight 72 or Flight 072 may refer to:
Air France Flight 072, went missing on 1 August, 1948
Gulf Air Flight 072, crashed on 23 August, 2000
Qantas Flight 72, made emergency landing on 7 October, 2008

0072